Vladislav Lozhkin (born 25 March 2002) is a Belarusian professional footballer who plays for Dinamo Minsk.

References

External links 
 
 
 Profile at Dinamo Minsk website

2002 births
Living people
People from Mogilev
Sportspeople from Mogilev Region
Belarusian footballers
Belarus youth international footballers
Belarus under-21 international footballers
Association football forwards
FC Dinamo Minsk players
FC Smolevichi players